Wang Wantong (born 16 February 1994) is a Chinese former professional racing cyclist, who rode professionally between 2015 and 2017, entirely for the  team. In 2015, she finished tenth at the Tour of Zhoushan Island.

See also
 List of 2015 UCI Women's Teams and riders

References

External links

1994 births
Living people
Chinese female cyclists
Cyclists from Shanghai
21st-century Chinese women